Auguste Émile Faguet (17 December 18477 June 1916) was a French author and literary critic.

Biography
Faguet was born at La Roche-sur-Yon, Vendée, and educated at the École normale supérieure in Paris. After teaching for some time in La Rochelle and Bordeaux, he returned to Paris to act as assistant professor of poetry in the university. Faguet became professor in 1897. He was elected to the Académie française in 1900, and received the ribbon of the Légion d'honneur in the next year.

Faguet acted as dramatic critic to the Soleil; from 1892 he was literary critic to the Revue Bleue; and in 1896 took the place of Jules Lemaître on the Journal des débats. Faguet died in Paris, aged 68.

Works

 De Aurelii Prudentii Clementis Carminibus Lyricis (1883).
 La Tragédie Française au XVIe Siècle (1883).
 Corneille (1885).
 La Fontaine (1889).
 Notes sur le Théatre Contemporain, (3 vols., 1889–1891).
 Politiques et Moralistes du XIXe Siècle (1891).
 Voltaire (1895).
 Cours de Poésie Française de l'Université de Paris (1897).
 Drame Ancien, Drame Moderne (1898).
 Questions Politiques (1899).
 Flaubert (1899).
 Discours de Réception de M. Émile Faguet (1901).
 André Chénier (1902).
 Propos Littéraires (5 vols., 1902–1910).
 Zola (1903).
 Le Libéralisme (1903).
 Propos de Théâtre (5 vols., 1903–1910).
 Simplification Simple de l’Orthographe (1905).
 Pour qu'on Lise Platon (1905).
 L'Anticléricalisme (1906).
 Le Socialisme en 1907 (1907).
 Problèmes Politiques du Temps Présent (1907).
 Le Pacifisme (1908).
 Discussions Politiques (1909).
 La Démission de la Morale (1910).
 Les Dix Commandements (10 vols., 1909–1910):
 De l'Amour de Soi 
 De l'Amour. 
 De la Famille.
 De l'Amitié. 
 De la Vieillesse. 
 De la Profession. 
 La Patrie. 
 De la Vérité. 
 Le Devoir. 
 De Dieu. 
 Études Littéraires (1910).
 Madame de Sévigné (1910).
 Le Féminisme (1910).
 Les Amies de Rousseau (1910).
 Rousseau Contre Molière (1910).
 Vie de Rousseau (1911).
 En Lisant les Beaux Vieux Livres (1911).
 La Poésie Française (1911).
 Les Préjugés Nécessaires (1911).
 Rousseau Penseur (1912).
 Rousseau Artiste (1912).
 La Prose Française (1912).
 Ce que Disent les Livres (1912).
 L’Art de Lire (1912).
 De l'Idée de Patrie (1913).
 Monseigneur Dupanloup: Un Grand Évêque (1914).
 En Lisant Molière (1914).
 Chansons d'un Passant (1921).

In English translation
 Politicians & Moralists of the Nineteenth Century (1899).
 A Literary History of France (1907).
 "French Seventeenth Century Literature and its European Influence." In: The Cambridge Modern History (1908).
 The Cult of Incompetence (1911).
 Balzac (1914).
 Flaubert (1914).
 The Dread of Responsibility (1914).
 Initiation into Literature (1914).
 Initiation into Philosophy (1914).
 On Reading Nietzsche (1918).

Selected articles
 "Mme de Staël," Revue des Deux Mondes 83, 1887.
 "M. Ferdinand Brunetière," La Revue de Paris 1, 1894.
 "Le Livre a Paris," Cosmopolis 5, 1897.
 "Mesdames, Bientot au Vote!," La Revue des Deux Frances 4, 1898.
 "Corrections de Flaubert", La Revue Bleue, 3 June 1899.
 "All About a Hat," The Living Age 8, September 1900.
 "The Symbolical Drama," The International Quarterly 8, September 1903/March 1904.
 "Andrew Lang's 'The Mysteries of History'," The Sewanee Review 16, 1908.
 "Philosophie Scientifique." In: Henri Poincaré: Biographie, Bibliographie Analytique des Écrits, 1909.
 "La Vie de Nietzsche," Revue des Deux Mondes 58, 1910.
 "Essais et Notices," Revue des Deux Mondes, LXXXe Année, 1910.
 "François Maynard," Revue des Pyrénées 23, 1911.
 "Viele-Griffin," La Revue Bleue, 15 April 1912.
 "Thiers," Revue des Deux Mondes, XCe Année, 1920.
 "On the Nature of the Dramatic Emotion," The Tulane Drama Review 3 (2), 1958.

Miscellany
 Preface to Guillaume Guizot's Montaigne: Études et Fragments (1899).
 Introduction to Montesquieu's Lettres Persanes (1900).
 Preface to Édouard Ruel's Du Sentiment Artistique dans la Morale de Montaigne (1901).
 Preface to Séché & Bertaut's L'Évolution du Théâtre Contemporain (1908).
 Preface to Joseph Grasset's The Marvels Beyond Science (1910).
 Preface to André Gayot's Une Ancienne Muscadine, Fortunée Hamelin (1911).
 Preface to Arthur Meyer's Ce Que Mes Yeux On Vu (1911).
 Preface to Jean Harmand's A Keeper of Royal Secrets: Being the Private and Political Life of Madame De Genlis (1913).
 Introduction to Pierre Marivaux's Théâtre (1915).
 Introduction to Lessage's Gil Blas (n.d.)
 Introduction to Paul Courier's Lettres et Pamphlets (n.d.)
 Introduction to Alfred de Musset's Poésies (n.d.)

See also
 Francisque Sarcey

References

Further reading
 Bordeaux, Henry (1924). Portraits d'Hommes. Paris: Plon-Nourrit & Cie.
 Duval, Maurice (1911). Émile Faguet, le Critique, le Moraliste, le Sociologue. Paris: Société Française d'Imprimerie et de Libraire.
 Dyrkton, Joerge (1996). "The Liberal Critic as Ideologue: Émile Faguet and fin-de-siècle Reflections on the Eighteenth Century," History of European Ideas, Vol. 22, Nos. 5–6, pp. 321–336.
 Gourmont, Remy de (1909). "Le Musset des Familles", Promenades Littéraires, 3e Série.
 Scheifley, William H. (1917). Brieux and Contemporary French Society. New York: G.P. Putnam's Sons.
 Séché, Alphonse (1904). Emile Faguet. Paris: Sansot.
 Wilmotte, Maurice (1907). Trois Semeurs d'Idées: Agénor de Gasparin, Emile de Laveleye, Emile Faguet. Paris: Fischbacher.

External links

 
 
 Works by Émile Faguet, at Hathi Trust
 Works by Émile Faguet, at Gallica
 Académie française: Émile Faguet

1847 births
1916 deaths
People from La Roche-sur-Yon
École Normale Supérieure alumni
French classical liberals
French literary critics
19th-century French writers
20th-century French non-fiction writers
Members of the Académie Française
Recipients of the Legion of Honour
Burials at Montparnasse Cemetery
Members of the Ligue de la patrie française
19th-century French male writers
Lycée Janson-de-Sailly teachers
20th-century French male writers
French male non-fiction writers